The Serbian Literary Herald was a Belgrade-based literary journal published in the first half of the 20th century. It was founded in February 1901, following the merger of the journals "Artwork" (Delo) and "Serbian Review" (Srpski pregled). The Herald was the most influential Serbian literary journal of its time. Most influential Serbian writers had their works published in the journal, which also printed literary, theatrical and cinematic reviews. It went on hiatus for the duration of World War I but resumed publishing once peace was restored. It continued publishing issues throughout the German occupation of Serbia during World War II. Once the occupation ended, the Heraldwhich had never been a propagator of left-wing viewscame to be viewed with suspicion by Yugoslavia's new communist authorities. In 1945–46, all issues published by the Herald during the German occupation were destroyed by the communists.

References

Bibliography 

 

Publications established in 1901
Serbian-language journals
1901 establishments in Serbia